is a passenger railway station located in the city of Setouchi, Okayama Prefecture, Japan, operated by the West Japan Railway Company (JR West).

Lines

Station layout
The station consists of one side platform serving single bi-directional track. There is a slope from the ticket gate to the platform, and it is wheelchair accessible. The station is unattended.

Adjacent stations

History
Oku Station was opened on 1 September 1962. With the privatization of Japanese National Railways (JNR) on 1 April 1987, the station came under the control of JR West.

Passenger statistics
In fiscal 2019, the station was used by an average of 1840 passengers daily

Surrounding area
Setouchi City Hall
Setouchi Municipal Setouchi Municipal Hospital
Okayama Prefectural Oku High School
Setouchi Municipal Oku Elementary School

See also
List of railway stations in Japan

References

External links

 JR West Station Official Site

Railway stations in Okayama Prefecture
Akō Line
Railway stations in Japan opened in 1962
Setouchi, Okayama